Trigonopterus mesai is a beetle in the family Curculionidae, native to Indonesia. It was first described by Alexander Riedel in 2019.

References 

mesai
Beetles described in 2019
Beetles of Asia
Insects of Indonesia
Endemic fauna of Indonesia